"" is a popular Turkish türkü (folk song) and a legend on which the song is based.  is a popular folktale in Turkey about an impossible love between a Muslim Turkish man (the composer himself) and a Greek-origin Muslim girl, his neighbor, from Seyitgazi. There are similar folk tunes in Anatolia among various ethnic groups, for instance, in Armenian  in Armenia.

References

Turkish songs
Year of song unknown
Songwriter unknown